Abu Bakr Siddique is a politician from Kishoreganj District of Bangladesh. He was elected a member of parliament from Kishoreganj-7 in 1988 Bangladeshi general election.

Career 
Abu Bakr Siddique was elected a Member of Parliament from Kishoreganj-7 constituency as an Jatiya Party candidate in the 1988 Bangladeshi general election.

References 

Living people
Year of birth missing (living people)
People from Kishoreganj District
Jatiya Party (Ershad) politicians
4th Jatiya Sangsad members